JD.com, Inc., also known as Jingdong, internationally known as Joybuy and formerly called 360buy, is a Chinese e-commerce company headquartered in Beijing. It is one of the two massive B2C online retailers in China by transaction volume and revenue, a member of the Fortune Global 500 and a major competitor to Alibaba-run Tmall. When classified as a tech company, it is the largest in China by revenue, and 7th in the world in 2021.

The company was founded by Liu Qiangdong on June 18, 1998, and its retail platform went online in 2004. It started as an online magneto-optical store, but soon diversified, selling electronics, mobile phones, computers, and similar items. The company changed its domain name to 360buy.com in June 2007 and then to JD.com in 2013. The latter purchase is understood to have cost $5,000,000. At the same time, JD.com announced its new logo and mascot. It is partly owned by Tencent, which has a 20% stake in the company.

JD.com has invested in high tech and AI delivery through drones, autonomous technology and robots, and possesses the largest drone delivery system, infrastructure and capability in the world. It has recently started testing robotic delivery services and building drone delivery airports, as well as operating driverless delivery by unveiling its first autonomous truck.

History 
The company was founded in 1998 as Jingdong Century Trading Co., Ltd selling magneto-optical in Beijing, China.

In 2004, the company's B2C site went online as jdlaser.com, starting their internet operations and competing directly with others firms like Alibaba  The Shanghai subsidiary was established in 2006, while the Guangzhou subsidiary was established in 2007. The company began using the domain name 360buy.com, and the name was changed to Jingdong Mall in June 2007. 

In 2010, 360buy.com started an online bookstore. CDs, DVDs, and ebooks were added in the following months. The following year, 360buy.com launched a platform named “POP” for brand owners. en.360buy.com was launched for the international market in October 2012.

In 2013, the company's domain name was changed to JD.com. 

Tencent acquired a 15% stake in JD.com in 2014 by paying cash and handing over its e-commerce businesses Paipai & QQ Wanggou plus a stake in Yixun to JD.com, in order to build a stronger competitor to Alibaba Group Holding Ltd. That same year, a subsidiary's lawsuit against JD.com was accepted by court.

In 2015, JD.com launched its Russian site aimed to expand its business globally. Walmart sold its Chinese e-Commerce business Yihaodian to JD.com in 2016 in exchange for a 5.9% equity stake valued at $1.5 billion. In October, Walmart filed 13G, revealing it nearly doubled its stake in JD.com to 10.9%  

In February 2017, Walmart increased investment in JD.com to 289.1 million shares, or 12.1%. In April, JD.com participated in the Salone del Mobile, featuring the installation Matrix, at the Università Statale of Milan. JD.com invested $397 million into Farfetch, a marketplace for luxury brands, in June as part of a new strategic partnership. JD.com and Walmart launch the first annual JD-Walmart August 8 shopping festival in July. JD.com also committed to further develop China's parcel delivery efficiency, investing US$101 million to subsidize merchants on JD.com for warehousing and distribution costs, for the upcoming 2017 Singles' Day. In November, JD.com achieved a sales record of US$19.1 billion.

JD.com opened its first chain of high-tech supermarkets 7Fresh in January 2018. That same month, JD.com invested in Vietnam's online retail service tiki.vn for $50 million. In February, JD.com invested in France & the Uk, and also released its spin-off JD Finance, raising $2.1 billion in a capital raise. Metcash partnered with JD.Com in May to sell groceries in China.

JD.com acquired Jade Palace Hotel in Beijing for US$400M in 2019. The company also partnered with Jiangsu Xinning Modern Logistics in order to automate its logistic services. In November, JD.com removed all items related to Houston Rockets in response to the organization's general manager posting a tweet about Hong Kong.

In April 2020, the company confidentially files for a second listing in Hong Kong. In August, 
the company reported net profits of $2.3 billion for the Q2 of 2020, and it reached a customer base of 417 million users. JD.com also announced that would be investing $830 million in its JD Health unit provided by private equity firm Hillhouse Capital. In October, Ping An Bank partnered with JDD to launch a joint credit card.

In January 2022, JD.com partnered with Shopify to begin selling Shopify's brands via its cross-border e-commerce site in China.

Digital marketing

Jingteng Plan 

In 2015, JD.com and Tencent announced the launch of the "Jingteng Plan", a portmanteau of the two companies' names, which will provide merchants with a complete solution to establish a brand and promote marketing effectiveness by linking JD.com consumption data with Tencent social data. JD.com provides online shopping and claims "authentic low price and quality assurance" and "customer first".

The Jingteng Plan has made progress in three areas: Jingdong has ~170 million E-Commerce platform users, and Tencent has the largest WeChat and mobile QQ users in China. The plan integrates consumer behaviour data and social data. The Jingteng Plan integrates marketing solutions for shopping and social data. “The precise orientation, closed-loop experience, user portraits, personalized creativity, unity of product and effect, and scientific measure of effectiveness” are said to be the six major aspects of the Jingteng Plan.

Partnership with Farfetch 
In light of the increasing number of mobile consumers in China, in 2017, Jingdong invested $397 million in Farfetch, which provided luxury e-commerce service based on the headquarters in London. The deal focussed on Farfetch's respect for intellectual property which has been contrasted with Alibaba's reputation. The Jingdong and Farfetch partnership aims to increase their market share in China.

Partnership with Ruyi 
On 4 September 2018, JD.com signed a strategic agreement with Ruyi, a leading textile and fashion giant who owns global fashion brands including Aquascutum, CERRUTI1881, Sandro and Maje. As stated in the press release, JD would deploy its smart logistics, supply chain solutions, big data-enabled inventory management and membership systems for Ruyi's subsidiary brands. Based on this partnership, JD and Ruyi will jointly establish fashion and lifestyle concept stores in core cities, such as Shanghai and Beijing.

Price war with Dangdang

Price war in physical books 
On December 10, 2010, JD's founder Liu Qiangdong announced through his Weibo account that every book sold on JD.com would be priced at 20 percent cheaper than its competitors. Although Liu did not give a specific name of his opponent, journalists thought Dangdang was JD.com's obvious rival in the field of online book sale. Dangdang is an electronic business platform well known for its core business, selling books, and ranked first among all online B2C booksellers of 2010 in China.

The price war between JD.com and Dangdang started on December 14; users of JD.com found out that the books were cheaper than Dangdang. In response, Dangdang also began to offer discounts to customers such as 30 yuan off when they spent 199 yuan or more. On the morning of December 16, Dangdang stated that the company would invest 40 million Chinese yuan to give discounts to customers. As a result, JD.com launched the second promotion to sell books at a lower price than Dangdang that afternoon. On the same day, Liu Qiangdong posted through his Weibo account that JD.com would give coupons instead of reducing prices to protect the benefits of publishers, which marked a phase of the price war.

Liu said that JD.com could not get supplies from some book publishers due to contracts between Dangdang and the publishers. From Liu's perspective, Dangdang were not allowing publishers to supply books to JD.com. However, the publishers denied the allegation. Su Huiyan, a business consultant of iResearch pointed out that JD.com wanted to attract more customers by the price war.

In November 2011, the second stage of the competition was triggered by Suning.com, a B2C shopping platform, announcing they would expand their business to include bookselling. JD.com and Dangdang competed with each other on lowering the prices of books again. JD.com provided its customers with a 10 percent discount on books while Dangdang sent promotional messages to its users stating that they would be offered 200 yuan if they purchased books for more than 100 yuan total. Dangdang used the slogan “争当败家子” meaning 'striving to be a spendthrift' aiming to increase their website traffic.

The sudden increase of orders not only caused network errors but also postponed transits of books, which fueled customers’ complaints.

Price war in electronic books 
On December 21, 2011, Dangdang launched its electronic book service online. More than 50,000 e-books were available on dangdang.com with over 90 percent of the e-books sold at 30 percent of the price of the physical books. JD.com started the e-book selling business online on February 20, 2012, and provided customers with more than 80,000 electronic books. JD.com also offered discounts to the buyers, this situation was the unfoldment of a new round of price war.

On April 17, 2013, most of the e-books on Dangdang's website were free for users to download. Consequently, JD.com priced 50,000 electronic books at 0 yuan to match. Liu Zhenyou, an author, criticized that both of them had raised their brand awareness, but their actions caused damage to book publishers.

See also 
 JD Gaming

References

External links 

 
Companies based in Beijing
Online retailers of China
Retail companies established in 1998
Internet properties established in 1998
Chinese companies established in 1998
Companies listed on the Nasdaq
Chinese brands
Companies listed on the Hong Kong Stock Exchange
2014 initial public offerings
Offshore companies of the Cayman Islands